The Experiment is a 1922 silent British drama film directed by Sinclair Hill and starring Evelyn Brent. The film is considered to be lost.

Cast
 Evelyn Brent as Doris Fielding
 Clive Brook as Vivian Caryll
 Templar Powell as Maj. Maurice Brandon
 Norma Whalley as Mrs. Lockyard
 Charles Croker-King as Philip Abingdon (as C. H. Croker-King)
 Cecil Kerr as Fricker
 Laura Walker as The Nurse
 Hilda Sims as Vera Abingdon

References

External links

1922 films
1922 drama films
1922 lost films
British drama films
British silent feature films
British black-and-white films
Films directed by Sinclair Hill
Films based on works by Ethel M. Dell
Films based on short fiction
Lost British films
Lost drama films
1920s British films
Silent drama films